Alfred Oscar Coffin (May 14, 1861 – 1933) was a professor of mathematics and Romance language. He is best known for being the first African American to obtain a PhD in biology.

Coffin earned his bachelor's degree and master's degree at Fisk University. In 1889, he earned his PhD in biology at Illinois Wesleyan University. His thesis was titled 'The Origin of the Mound Builders'.

In 1887, Coffin taught at Alcorn Agricultural and Mechanical College for two years in Mississippi.
From 1889 to 1895, he worked as a professor of mathematics and Romance language at Wiley University at Marshall, Texas. He later worked as the booking agent for John William Boone.

Early life

Coffin was born May 14, 1861, in Pontotoc, Mississippi.

References

1861 births
1933 deaths
African-American educators
American educators
People from Pontotoc, Mississippi
African-American scientists
American biologists
Illinois Wesleyan University alumni
Fisk University alumni
Academics from Mississippi
American zoologists
20th-century African-American people